Thor Kristensen (born 4 June 1980 in Hadsund, North Denmark Region) was a member of Denmark's rowing team, the Gold Four, during the 2004 Summer Olympics in Athens. Along with Thomas Ebert, Stephan Mølvig, and Eskild Ebbesen, he won the gold medal in the Lightweight Four division.

External links
 
 

1980 births
Living people
Danish male rowers
Olympic rowers of Denmark
Olympic gold medalists for Denmark
Rowers at the 2004 Summer Olympics
Olympic medalists in rowing
Medalists at the 2004 Summer Olympics
People from Hadsund
World Rowing Championships medalists for Denmark
Sportspeople from the North Jutland Region